Václav Láska (1862–1943) was a renowned Czech astronomer, geophysicist, and mathematician. He was based mainly at Charles University, and was the founding director (1920-1933) of the State Institute of Geophysics, which later became the Institute of Geophysics of the Czech Academy of Sciences.

Láska's empirical rule 
This empirical rule is one way how to approximate the distance from an earthquake's epicenter. The rule is most fitting for distance in the range of 2 − 10 Mm (thousand km). The epicentral distance in thousands of km is roughly equal to the difference between arrival times of S and P waves in minutes minus 1.

External links
 Charles University, Faculty of Mathematics and Physics, Department of Geophysics (in Czech)
 MacTutor Entry 

1862 births
1943 deaths
Czech mathematicians